Arcola may refer to:

Places
 Australia
 Arcola, Grafton, a heritage-listed house in New South Wales
Canada
 Arcola, Saskatchewan, a town in the Province of Saskatchewan
 Arcola Airport, an airport in the Province of Saskatchewan

England
 Arcola Theatre, a theatre in the London Borough of Hackney

Italy
 Arcola, Liguria, a comune in the province of La Spezia
 Arcola, Verona, alternate name for Arcole

United States
 Arcola, Alabama, founded by French Bonapartists, now a ghost town, in Hale County
 Arcola, California, an unincorporated community in Madera County
 Arcola, Georgia, an unincorporated community
 Arcola, Illinois, a city in Douglas County
 Arcola, Indiana, an unincorporated community in Allen County
 Arcola, Louisiana, an inhabited place in Tangipahoa Parish
 Arcola, Minnesota, an unincorporated community in Washington County
 Arcola, Mississippi, a town in Washington County
 Arcola, Missouri, a village in Dade County
 Arcola, New Jersey, an unincorporated community in Bergen County
 Arcola, Pennsylvania, an unincorporated community in Montgomery County
 Arcola, Texas, a city in Fort Bend County
 Arcola, Virginia, an unincorporated community in Loudoun County
 Arcola, West Virginia, an unincorporated community
 Arcola Carnegie Public Library, a library in Douglas County, Illinois
 Arcola Township, Douglas County, Illinois, a township in Douglas County

Other
 Arcola (record label), an English record label
 Arcola (moth), a snout moth genus of subfamily Phycitinae
 Battle of Arcola, 1796 battle at the Bridge of Arcole (Verona, Italy)
 Arcola, The Battle for Italy 1796, a 1979 board wargame that simulates the Battle of Arcola
 Chachi Arcola, a character in the American television series Happy Days